Nasarkan may refer to:
 Nasarkan-e Olya
 Nasarkan-e Sofla